The Kiss and cry is the area in an ice rink.

Kiss and cry or Kiss & Cry may also refer to:
 Kiss and Cry (film), 2017 Canadian film
 "Kiss & Cry" (song), a song by Hikaru Utada
 Kim Yuna's Kiss & Cry, a South Korean TV series